The 2008 Ivan Hlinka Memorial Tournament was an under-18 ice hockey tournament held in Břeclav, Czech Republic and Piešťany, Slovakia from August 12–16, 2008.  The two venues were Alcaplast Arena in Břeclav and Zimný Štadión in Piešťany. Canada captured their thirteenth gold medal of the tournament, defeating Russia 6–3 in the gold medal game, while Sweden defeated Finland 3–2 to earn the bronze medal.

Preliminary round

Group A

Group B

Final round

Seventh place game

Fifth place game

Bronze medal game

Gold medal game

Final standings

See also
2008 IIHF World U18 Championships
2008 World Junior Championships

External links
2008 Ivan Hlinka Memorial Tournament on Hockey Canada
Official Website

Ivan Hlinka Memorial Tournament, 2008
2008
International ice hockey competitions hosted by Slovakia
International ice hockey competitions hosted by the Czech Republic
Ivan
2008–09 in Slovak ice hockey